This is a list of special episodes of the professional wrestling television series WWE Raw. Throughout its broadcast history, the show has aired episodes that have different themes. Some of them are yearly events such as the WWE draft and the Slammy Awards. Others include tributes to various professional wrestlers who have recently died or retired from actively performing.

List

See also

 List of WWE SmackDown special episodes
 List of WWE NXT special episodes

References

Special episodes
Raw special episodes